Nikephoros was junior Byzantine Emperor from 741 to 743. He was crowned after his father, Artabasdos ( 741–743) usurped Emperor Constantine V ( 741–775). Constantine seized power again on 2 November 743, and Nikephoros, Artabasdos, and Niketas were blinded and confined in the Chora Church.

Life
Nikephoros was made strategos of Thrace by his father Artabasdos soon after he usurped the throne from Byzantine Emperor Constantine V, in June/July of 741. He was elevated to junior co-emperor at some point in 741.

After Constantine defeated Artabasdos on 2 November 743, he had Artabasdos, Nikephoros, and Niketas humiliated in the Hippodrome of Constantinople before being blinded and confined in the Chora Church.

References

Bibliography

Byzantine junior emperors
8th-century Byzantine people
Byzantine prisoners and detainees
Byzantine governors
Governors of the Theme of Thrace
Sons of Byzantine emperors